Liavol or Liaval or Liawal or Liyavol or Layavol, also rendered as Liava , may refer to:
 Liavol-e Olya
 Liavol-e Sofla